Sikandar Pura is a village located on the Chunian-Khudian road,  from Khudian and  from Chunian, in Kasur District, in the Punjab province of Pakistan.  It is a highly populated area.  Its union council is Khai Hithar.

References

External links

Sikandar Pura District Kasur at WikiMapia.

Kasur District
Populated places in Kasur District